James Olan Mills, also known as Jay Mills, is an American archaeologist primarily known for his work in paleopathology and the excavations at Nekhen (Hierakonpolis), the capital of Upper Egypt in the late 4th millenniumBC, ancient Egypt's Protodynastic Period.

Life
Mills received his BA from Vanderbilt University in 1984. He was a professor with the Department of Anthropology at the University of Florida, with a particular focus on Egyptology, paleopathology, and the importance of beer and bread in ancient Egyptian culture and health.

He served as codirector of the Egyptian Studies Association at the University of South Carolina and worked with its excavations in Nekhen, participating under Michael Hoffman in 1985–6 and directing them in 1987–8 and the early 1990s with Walter Fairservis, and returning in the late 1990s under Barbara Adams and Renée Friedman. In 1986, together with Ahmed Irawy Radwan, he discovered and studied a petroglyph which possibly preserves a predynastic record of the solstices which influenced the development of the 365-day Egyptian civil calendar.

He also assisted with the archaeological survey during the establishment of Old Santee Canal Park near Charleston, South Carolina.

Works
  (with Tommy Charles).
 .
 .
 .
  (with George J.  Armelagos).
 .
  (with George J. Armelagos).

References

Citations

Bibliography
 .
 .

External links
 .

Year of birth missing (living people)
Living people
American anthropologists
American Egyptologists
Vanderbilt University alumni